JDD may refer to:

 Le Journal du Dimanche, a French newspaper
 Wood County Airport (Texas), United States (FAA code: JDD)
 Journal of Drugs in Dermatology, a medical journal